Motin (Cyrillic: Мотин) may refer to the following people:
Given name
Motin Mia, Bangladeshi footballer 
Motin Rahman, Bangladeshi film director

Surname
Aleksandr Motin (born 1944), Soviet rower
Cendra Motin (born 1975), French politician
Johan Motin (born 1989), Swedish ice hockey defenceman
Marion Motin, French dancer and choreographer
Pierre Motin (1566–1612), French poet and translator.